The men's C-1 500 metres event was an open-style, individual canoeing event conducted as part of the Canoeing at the 1976 Summer Olympics program. This event debuted at these games.

Medallists

Results

Heats
Fifteen competitors were entered. Held on July 28, the top three finishers in each heat moved on to the semifinals with the others were relegated to the repechages.

Repechages
Held on July 28, the top three finishers in each repechage moved on to the semifinals.

Semifinals
Three semifinals were held on July 30 with the top three finishers in each semifinal advancing to the final.

Final
The final took place on July 30.

Wood jumped out to an early lead to the delight of the Canadian crowd of 5000 leading from start to the last few strokes when he was passed by the favorite Rogov.

References
1976 Summer Olympics official report Volume 3. p. 177. 
Sports-reference.com 1976 C-1 500 m results.
Wallechinsky, David and Jaime Loucky (2008). "Canoeing: Men's Canadian Singles 500 Meters". In The Complete Book of the Olympics: 2008 Edition. London: Aurum Press Limited. p. 478.

Men's C-1 500
Men's events at the 1976 Summer Olympics